István Kozma (27 November 1939 – 9 April 1970) was a Hungarian Greco-Roman wrestler. He won Olympic gold medals in 1964 and in 1968, and the World Championship in 1962, 1966, and 1967. In 1967 he was selected as the Hungarian Sportsman of the Year. Kozma died in a car accident, aged 30.

References

External links 

 
 
 

1939 births
1970 deaths
Martial artists from Budapest
Hungarian male sport wrestlers
Olympic wrestlers of Hungary
Wrestlers at the 1960 Summer Olympics
Wrestlers at the 1964 Summer Olympics
Wrestlers at the 1968 Summer Olympics
Olympic gold medalists for Hungary
Olympic medalists in wrestling
Medalists at the 1968 Summer Olympics
Medalists at the 1964 Summer Olympics
World Wrestling Champions
Road incident deaths in Hungary
European Wrestling Championships medalists
World Wrestling Championships medalists
20th-century Hungarian people